The Pilipinas Super League (PSL) is a professional basketball league in the Philippines.

History
The Pilipinas Super League (PSL) was founded in December 2021 by former officials of another league; the Pilipinas VisMin Super Cup. It was established by former VisMin Cup CEO Rocky Chan and former COO Chelito Caro. Chan assumed the post of PSL President and Caro as the league commissioner. Former professional basketballer Marc Pingris was appointed as commissioner in January 2022 succeeding Caro.

The PSL aims to garner at least 10 teams for its inaugural season. The league is aimed primarily for players in Mindanao and Visayas like the VisMin Cup. It will have three conferences, one which will allow foreign players or imports. There is also a plan for a under-21 division.

Teams
Most teams are based in Luzon in the northern part of the Philippines and in Mindanao and Visayas regions of southern Philippines.

Former teams

U-21 teams (2022)

Champions

U-21 champions

U-18 Champions

See also
 Philippine Basketball Association
 NBL
 Filbasket
 Pilipinas VisMin Super Cup
 Chooks-to-Go Pilipinas 3x3

References

Basketball leagues in the Philippines
2021 establishments in the Philippines
Sports leagues established in 2021